Paulsen is a Danish, Norwegian and German patronymic surname.

Paulsen may also refer to:

Fictional characters
 Jed Paulsen, a fictional DC Comics character who became Jed Walker

Other uses
 Paulsen Peak, located on South Georgia, a British territory in the southern Atlantic Ocean
 novels
 Murphy (Gary Paulsen novel)
 The River (Paulsen)

See also
Paulson (disambiguation)